The 2007 WNBA season was the eleventh for the Los Angeles Sparks.

Offseason

WNBA Draft

Preseason

Regular season

Season standings

Season schedule

Player stats

Awards and honors
Lisa Leslie, Best WNBA Player ESPY Award

References

External links
Sparks on Basketball Reference

Los Angeles Sparks seasons
Los Angeles Sparks
Los Angeles